Michael Topf (born 1980), records under the name DJ Brace, is a Canadian DJ and producer. He is the winner of multiple awards, including the 2016 DMC Online DJ Championship. He has released music through Balanced Records, ESL Music, Nostomania Records, Switchstance Recordings and Costume Records. DJ Brace collaborates with Soul Khan, Ancient Astronauts, Kabanjak, Dubmatix, Vekked and various other artists. His music can also be heard on the Fox TV series Prison Break and on the Canadian TV channel CBC.

Awards 

2017 DMC World Online Team DJ Champion [The Fresherthans]
2016 DMC World Online Champion 
2016 WMC DJ Spin-Off Champion [Scratch Category]
2015 DMC World Online Team DJ Champion [The Fresherthans]
2015 B4B Online Scratch Battle Canadian Champion 
2013 Kid Koala 8-Bit Blues battle Champion
2011 Felix award nomination for "DJ Brace presents The Electric Nosehair Orchestra in Synesthasia" in the category of Electronic album of the year.
2009 Juno Award for DJ Brace presents The Electric Nosehair Orchestra in Nostomania
2004 DMC Canada Champion

Discography

Solo projects 

 2008: Nostomania 
 2010: Synesthasia (NR02-∞)
 2017: Apatheia (NR26-∞)

EPs and singles 

 2009: DJ Brace featuring Brown Bag AllStars - Everyday (NR01-∞)
 2012: Koncept - Watch The Skyfall EP (NR06-∞)
 2012: Kabanjak & DJ Brace - Abra Kabra (SRDR 019)
 2016: DJ Brace - Close Cuts (Fresherthan Records)
 2016: Hard Luck Banjoes (Soul Khan & DJ Brace) - "Once Again" (Independent)
 2016: DJ Brace - SMH (Costume Records)
 2017: DJ Brace - Beyond EP (Costume Records)

Collaborations 

 2005: Gruf & DJ Brace - Soundbarriers (Independent)
 2009: Birdapres & DJ Brace - Raw (NR00-∞)
 2011: Brown Bag AllStars – Brown Bag Season Vol. 1 (NR04-∞)
 2013: Various - DJ Brace presents The Electric Nosehair Orchestra Remixed (NR12-∞)

Remixes 

 2009: Ancient Astronauts featuring the Pharcyde - "Classic DJ Brace Remix" (ESL 155)
 2011: Dubmatix - "Deep Dark Dub" (DJ Brace Remix) (CCT3025-2)
 2012: Ancient Astronauts – "Still A Soldier DJ Brace Remix" (ESL 197)

Appearances 

 2010: J57 - Digital Society (BEP2010-15)
 2010: Kabanjak - Tree Of Mystery (ESL 166)
 2011: Cella Chest - Cella Chest (NR05-∞)
 2011: maticulous - The maticulous EP (MSM001)
 2012: J57 - 2057 EP
 2012: The Audible Doctor - I Think That
 2019 Abraham Inc - Together We Stand

References

External links 
Official Website
Facebook
Twitter
Discogs
Bandcamp

1980 births
Living people
Canadian DJs
Juno Award for Instrumental Album of the Year winners
Musicians from Winnipeg